Sidney J. Watson Arena, or simply Watson Arena, is an ice hockey arena on the campus of Bowdoin College in Brunswick, Maine. Watson Arena seats 1,900 plus additional standing room. The arena opened on January 18, 2009, and is home to the Bowdoin Polar Bears men's and women's ice hockey teams. The arena is named for former Athletic Director Sid Watson.

Watson Arena was the first newly constructed ice arena built in the United States to earn LEED certification.

History
Watson Arena replaced Dayton Arena, which had served as the home of Bowdoin ice hockey since 1956.  On January 18, 2009, the women's ice hockey team tied Hamilton College 1–1 in the first game at Watson Arena.

References

External links
 
 Sidney J. Watson Arena construction details

2009 establishments in Maine
Bowdoin Polar Bears ice hockey
Buildings and structures in Brunswick, Maine
College ice hockey venues in the United States
Indoor ice hockey venues in Maine
Sports venues completed in 2009